Jeane Gardiner (d. 26 May 1651 in Saint George, Bermuda) was an alleged British witch. She is one of few people to have been executed for witchcraft in Bermuda.

Gardiner was the wife of one Ralph Gardiner, and was put on trial by Capt'n Josias Fforster, Governor, accused of having affected a woman with magic; she had threatened she would cramp Tomasin, a mulatto woman, who was later struck blind and dumb for 2 hours. Another woman, Anne Bowen, was tried with her. 

Gardiner pleaded not guilty. A jury of women was appointed to search her body: Mrs. Ellen Burrowes, Mrs. Fflora Wood, Mrs. Eliz. Stowe, Allice Sparkes, Eliz. Brangman. She was then subjected to the ordeal of water, and after being thrown twice in the sea, she floated like a cork and could not sink, she was judged guilty of witchcraft and sentenced to death. She was executed on Monday 26 May 1651. The fate of Anne Bowen is unknown. 

In the period of 1651-1696, 22 witch trials were held on Bermuda to 18 women and four men, of which five women and one man was executed. The trial against Sarah Basset (or Sally Basset) in 1730 is also sometimes counted among them. Most of them were held in the 1650s, a period when witch trials were common in England itself, and the accusation was often sickness afflicted upon slaves by use of magic.

References 
 http://www.rootsweb.ancestry.com/~bmuwgw/witches.htm

Literature 
 Memorials of the Bermudas", Maj Lefroy

Year of birth missing
1651 deaths
People executed for witchcraft
Executed Bermudian people